The 1838 Chicago mayoral election saw Whig nominee Buckner Stith Morris defeat Democrat William Jones by an 8.5 point margin.

The election was held on March 6.

Results

References

Mayoral elections in Chicago
Chicago
1830s in Chicago